Cross-Country is a fictional character from the G.I. Joe: A Real American Hero toyline, comic books and animated series. He is the G.I. Joe Team's H.A.V.O.C. driver and debuted in 1986.

Profile
His real name is Robert M. Blais, and his rank is that of sergeant E-5. Cross-Country was born in Greensboro, North Carolina.

Cross-Country's primary military specialty is armor, and his secondary military specialty is heavy equipment operator. His father was a bulldozer operator, and his mother drove a grader, therefore he had a natural affinity for heavy machinery, coupled with an uncanny sense of direction and fearlessness under fire. He is a qualified expert with the heavy laser cannon, M-16A2, M-2 50 cal. MG, and .45 auto-pistol.

Toys
Cross-Country was first released as an action figure in 1986, packaged with the H.A.V.O.C. (Heavy Articulated Vehicle Ordnance Carrier). This version of Cross-Country wore a Confederate flag emblem on his belt-buckle. A new version of Cross-Country was released in 1993, as part of the Battle Corps line.

A new figure of Cross Country based on his cartoon likeness will be released in 2014 by the G.I. Joe Collectors' Club's Membership Incentive Figure.

Comics
In the Marvel Comics G.I. Joe series, he first appeared driving the HAVOC vehicle, in G.I. Joe: A Real American Hero #51 (September 1986). He is mocked by Zarana as being a hillbilly, and proudly argues that instead he is a redneck. He and Sgt. Slaughter man the HAVOC and pursue the escaping Joe prisoner Zartan and his Dreadnoks, who are in the Thunder Machine. Cross Country and the Dreadnok driver Thrasher shoot up each other's vehicles and play chicken, which is only won when the Dreadnoks go on their two right wheels. Thrasher escapes via suicidal moves and despite Sgt. Slaughter later finding the group, they avoid notice via Zartan's disguise expertise. Later, Cross Country is one of the first three Joes to discover that Cobra soldiers had infiltrated the now empty Joe headquarters. He takes part in the overland defense.

Cross-Country is seen piloting his HAVOC overland at the Joe's Utah, United States base. Cross-Country is featured as part of a small Joe team getting into trouble in the New Jersey countryside. Along with Mutt, Law and their dogs, Junkyard and Order, Cross-Country locates a Dreadnok hideout, an abandoned gas station. During this incident, Cross-Country obliterates Thrasher's new Thunder Machine by driving the HAVOC straight over it.

Cross-Country is part of a mission in the fictional country of Trucial Abysmia. His squad of Joes destroy several Cobra facilities called Terror Dromes but they are captured to a man. A mistake while talking with Cobra Commander leads the Joe's captors, the Crimson Twins to assume the prisoners are to be executed. A S.A.W. Viper steps forward upon seeing the Twin's reluctance. He quickly slays Doc, Heavy Metal, Thunder and Crankcase. A concealed knife allows the survivors to wound the Viper and escape in a 'Cobra Rage' vehicle. The Joes manage to destroy several pursuers. The tank is hit by a Cobra 'Maggot', and Quick-Kick, Crazylegs and Breaker are killed. Cross Country, Duke and Lt. Falcon manage to escape to safety.

IDW Publishing
Cross-Country is part of a G.I. Joe tank crew that works with the remnants of the Oktober Guard. At first, along with Cover Girl, Steeler and Wild Card, Cross-Country had been part of a friendly confrontation designed to showcase who had the better tanks to outside interests. Thanks to severe Cobra influence, the Joes and the Guard team up to protect innocent and not so innocent civilians from being murdered.

Animated series

Sunbow
Cross-Country appeared in the original G.I. Joe animated series, voiced by Michael McConnohie. He first appeared in the second-season episode "Arise, Serpentor, Arise! (Part 1)", in which Beach-Head tells General Hawk, Duke, and Flint that Cross-Country is putting a tape deck in his H.A.V.O.C. Cross-Country states that it would be for fighting music, especially when the other Joes would want to beat him up. The character enjoys listening to country music during his appearances. He wears various Confederate clothing articles from the Civil War including boot leggings, and a soldier's infantry cap.

He had a major role in "The Spy Who Rooked Me", in which he, Flint, Lady Jaye and Dial-Tone are on a mission to deliver nerve gas to a chemical weapons arsenal, working with a British secret agent as well.

Cross-Country's most prominent role was in "Into Your Tent I Will Silently Creep". In the episode, he distracts Cobra Tele-Vipers with country music played from his tape deck in his H.A.V.O.C, allowing the Joes to defeat them. However, his tape deck is also destroyed along with his H.A.V.O.C in the battle. He gets a new one, but it is soon stolen by a robot rodent. He initially accuses his fellow Joes of the theft, telling them he has had enough of them picking on him. He later uses another tape deck as bait to catch the real thief and sees a robotic rat take it, also finding other robotic rats stealing other Joes' belongings. Cross-Country follows them to their secret lair, eventually leading to his discovery of a Cobra slave labor camp and a meeting of the Coil, an organization created by Cobra Commander dedicated to overthrowing Serpentor. He is captured, but quickly escapes and finds a lighthouse, which he uses to signal a boat. After being rescued, Cross-Country leads the Joes to the lair, where they free the slaves and he recovers all the Joes' stolen personal items, collecting them in a bag. Cross-Country defeats Cobra Commander, Firefly and Storm Shadow, using the bag as a weapon, but accidentally breaks the items in it as well.

Cross-Country is featured along with Beach Head in a PSA, in which they teach kids to wear helmets for protection when driving ATVs.

G.I. Joe: The Movie
Cross-Country appeared briefly in the 1987 animated film G.I. Joe: The Movie. He is seen during the B.E.T. test, participates in the battle at the lab where G.I. Joe has hidden the B.E.T., and is present when a critically injured Duke falls into a coma.

References

External links
 Cross-Country at JMM's G.I. Joe Comics Home Page

Comics characters introduced in 1986
Fictional characters from North Carolina
Fictional drivers
Fictional military sergeants
Fictional United States Army personnel
G.I. Joe soldiers
Male characters in animated series
Male characters in comics